General Sir Richard Cyril Byrne Haking,  (24 January 1862 – 9 June 1945), was a British general who commanded XI Corps in the First World War.

Arguments over the late release of Haking's Corps on the first day of the Battle of Loos were instrumental in forcing the resignation of Sir John French as Commander-in-Chief of the British Expeditionary Force (BEF). Haking is remembered chiefly for the high casualties suffered by his forces (including many Australian troops) at the second Battle of Fromelles, launched while the Battle of the Somme was underway 80 km to the south, although at least one British historian has sought to defend his reputation, regarding him as an "intelligent and capable man" unfairly maligned in the popular mythology of the war. Although blocked from further promotion, he continued to command XI Corps – including in Italy in the winter of 1917–1918 and in Flanders in April 1918 – until the end of the war.

He was the League of Nations High Commissioner for the Free City of Danzig in the early 1920s.

Early career
Haking was probably born in Halifax, West Yorkshire, the son of a clergyman, Reverend Richard Haking. He attended Sandhurst, then was commissioned into the 67th (South Hampshire) Regiment of Foot (which that year became part of the Hampshire Regiment) on 22 January 1881.

Haking saw active service in Burma 1885–1887, and was promoted captain in 1889. He married Rachel Buford Hancock, daughter of Sir Henry James Burford-Hancock, on 28 September 1891; they had no children.

Haking studied at Staff College 1896–1897. He was Deputy Assistant Adjutant-General for Cork District 1898–1899. He was promoted major in 1899. He served on the staff in the Boer War, then returned to Staff College, first as a lecturer 1901–1904, then as Deputy Assistant Adjutant-General (DAAG) 1904–1906. Whilst on the faculty at Camberley he was promoted lieutenant-colonel in 1903 and colonel in 1905.

Haking was GSO1 (chief of staff) to 3rd Division 1906–1908, then Brigadier-General General Staff (BGGS) Southern Command in 1908. He was honoured with the Companion of the Order of the Bath (CB) in 1910.

According to Andy Simpson, in the Edwardian period "he established a reputation as a sound tactical thinker". His book Company Training (1913) was partly inspired by Haig's 1909 Field Service Regulations. The book espoused the pre-war belief that morale and leadership were the most important factor in winning a battle. He also argued that the attacker would have the advantage over the defender, even if numerically inferior, and deprecated the idea that modern weapons had made defence superior to attack. The book was reprinted during the first part of the war, at least. The book was considered "first class" and in Gordon Corrigan's view "even today ... has a freshness about it and an insight into human characteristics that would not be out of place in a modern military work".

Western Front: brigade and division commander
Haking was given command of the 5th Infantry Brigade in September 1911, and took it to the Western Front on the outbreak of war in August 1914, as part of Douglas Haig's I Corps. On 23 August 1914—the day of the Battle of Mons—in accordance with a request by Smith-Dorrien, GOC II Corps, Haig sent Haking with three battalions to make contact with II Corps on Haig's left, but Haking reported back that he had made no contact with the enemy. He helped force the Petit Morin during the Battle of the Marne. During the advance after the Marne, Haking's brigade was at the forefront at the Battle of the Aisne, and on 14 September his was one of the few units to fight its way onto the Chemin des Dames after the crossing of the River Aisne. Haig recorded that Haking's 5th Brigade made good progress on the eastern slopes of the Beaulne ridges, reaching the ridge of Tilleul de Courtacon, before having to pull back on meeting opposition. However, on that day he received a head wound that required three months' recuperation.

He returned to the front in November. On 21 December 1914 he was promoted to command the 1st Division from 21 December 1914, with the rank of major-general. His division took part in the Battle of Aubers Ridge (also known as the first Battle of Fromelles) in May 1915, where the three attacking divisions suffered a total of 11,600 casualties and where he argued for further attacks despite the clear failure of the first assault. His attacking brigades lost over 50% of their fighting strength in little over an hour. He was not blamed for what Simpson describes as the "flawed artillery plan and lack of artillery support" at Aubers Ridge.

With the BEF expanding massively in size, Haking was one of the divisional commanders (he was fourth in order of seniority after Thomas Morland, Henry Horne and Hubert Gough) whom Haig recommended to the Prime Minister, H. H. Asquith, on 8 July 1915 as suitable for command of corps and armies in due course, although only Horne and Gough attained the latter level of command.

Western Front: Loos
On 1 September Haig recommended Haking, as a known "thruster", for command of XI Corps, part of First Army. The promotion was not confirmed until 4 September as Sir John French, Commander-in-Chief BEF, was ill. Haking would hold this command until the end of the war.

Preparations and First Day
Haking's corps took part as a reserve in the Battle of Loos in September 1915. He later told the Official Historian, James Edward Edmonds, that he had thought Haig wanted XI Corps to fill the gap between Hubert Gough's I Corps and Henry Rawlinson's IV Corps in the offensive, not act as a reserve at all. Before the battle Haking spoke to the men of 2nd Guards Brigade. One observer recorded that he "spoke very confidently, comparing the German line to the crust of a pie, behind which, once broken, he said, there is not much resistance to be expected. He ended up by saying "I don’t tell you this to cheer you up. I tell it you because I really believe it". He assured his commanders that there would be no German resistance once their line had been broken (letter of Lt-Col Rowland Feilding to his wife, 16 September 1915). Although "everyone was too optimistic", Haking's promises to Regimental officers that there would be "very little opposition" were "altogether misleading" and a "most regrettable travesty of the real facts" (testimony of various colonels to the Official Historian in the mid-1920s).

XI Corps were committed to battle (21st and 24th Division, both New Army formations, but not the Guards Division which was to be held back at first), tired and hungry after an overnight march to conceal their presence from the enemy, at 2.30pm on 25 September, the first day of the battle.

Second Day
GHQ released the Guards Division to First Army control at 1.45pm on 26 September, and it spent the day marching up to the front. Haking was ordered (at 11.30pm) to submit plans for it to attack the next day. The next day Haig wanted to call off the attack, but Haking felt it would not be possible to do so in time. Haking also lifted the artillery barrage off the German front positions to bombard more distant targets at 3pm, an hour before the attack was due to begin – Rawlinson, who visited him at 10am, thought this a bad idea, but kept his doubts to himself. Under pressure from Haig, XI Corps issued orders to 3 Guards Brigade that they were not to attack unless 2 Guards Brigade had already been successful, but these orders were not issued until the former had already left their trenches. XI Corps suffered another 8,000 casualties on the second day. Lloyd agrees with Prior & Wilson that the blame for the decision to continue the attack on the second day lies with Haig, although he points out that Haking took his men forward without any doubts.

Lloyd argues that Haking "proved unequal to the task" of welding XI Corps into a fighting formation. Poor relations between staff "do not reflect well on his managerial skills". Although Haking was not personally responsible for the attacks on 25 and 26 September, he offered no dissent to Haig's plans and his subsequent plans shared Haig's underestimation of the enemy and "traditional" view of artillery (i.e. that it was an adjunct to the infantry attack, rather than grasping the importance of concentrated artillery fire in making such an attack possible).

Ousting of Sir John French
The late release of Haking's XI Corps on the first day was thought – supposedly – to have thrown away a chance of breakthrough and decisive victory. French blamed poor First Army staffwork and traffic control, whilst Haig alleged that French had released the reserve too late. On the day itself Rawlinson had telephoned Haking at 12.20pm urging him to get the reserves forward, and wrote on the telephone log that Haking reported "traffic" difficulties. In a letter of 10 October Haking blamed difficulties as his divisions moved through the administration areas of I Corps and IV Corps. However, Haking later – after a meeting with Haig – claimed that this had been based on "memory of verbal statements made to (him)" by the commanders of 21st and 24th Divisions on the night of 25 September. He now wrote that "the most careful arrangements were made by First Army to ensure that the roads were kept clear". He then blamed "indifferent march discipline" (Haig was blaming the delay on "bad march discipline" – almost exactly the same phrase). In the final paragraph of his report he wrote that "there is none to blame except GHQ and they know it". Lloyd writes "it is hard to avoid the conclusion that Haking was deliberately falsifying or "cooking" his evidence to make it more palatable to (Haig)". Haig’s and Haking’s slur was bitterly resented by a number of officers who later testified to the Official Historian in the 1920s about traffic congestion and poor direction by the Military Police.

Haking was also one of those who criticised French's deployment of the reserve to King George V when the King visited the front in October, as part of the moves which led to French's enforced resignation.

In Simpson’s view Loos was a "disaster" but "Haking escaped censure on this occasion … he was … quick to back Haig in the subsequent intrigues against French, and after Haig became commander-in-chief the security of Haking’s position was not in doubt".

Subsequent attacks
A subsequent attack ensued on 13 October. In some respects, writes Lloyd, this was better-planned than what had gone before. Haking insisted that the attacking brigades be given precise orders as to their objectives, and the direction and timing of their advance. Care was taken to see that troops were supplied with grenades, that they took machine guns forward with them, and that they kept communications trenches clear. 18-pounder guns were to be kept in the front line to give covering fire as the men went over the top, a tactic used at the Battle of Festubert earlier in the year, whilst at a First Army conference on 6 October it was agreed that XI Corps would be supported by "every available gun" and by smoke over a wide front (i.e. forcing the Germans to disperse their own fire). Attempts were also made to assimilate tactical lessons from recent assaults and in some divisions to train on scale models.

On 10 and 12 October, divisional artillery concentrated on wire cutting whilst heavier guns concentrated on destroying enemy strongpoints. Haking persuaded himself that the enemy were "shaken and disorganised" ("little more than wishful thinking" in Lloyd's view) and that enough artillery and gas was now available to win a decisive victory (in the event the bombardment did little damage to the German positions). Once again Haking gave a series of highly optimistic speeches to the attacking brigades. However, on the day of the attack, and apparently at Haking's insistence, the heavy guns were again "lifted" from the German front line an hour before the 2pm attack, leaving them to be bombarded only by shrapnel – a tactic used by the Guards Brigade earlier in the battle. Haking ignored advice from Haig (on the telephone on 28 September) to suggest that this had been a bad idea, although in accordance with Army doctrine at the time Haig once again delegated the decision to Haking as the "man on the spot". Haking appears to have thought that High Explosive fire might disperse British gas (although gas was, this time, being used as an adjunct to the attack rather than a decisive weapon in itself), but he also wanted to give the Germans "a chance to run away". Stuart-Wortley, GOC 46th Division, was under Haking's command for the attack. He later complained that he and his troops had been "hurried into the trenches" with barely enough time "to become acquainted with the actual position". Haking overruled his wish to launch a careful step-by-step attack, telling him that he would "reach Fosse 8 without firing a shot". In Lloyd's description Haking was "seriously misleading the troops under his command" or else "simply ignorant". The attack went so badly that Lt-Col J. C. Wedgwood MP sent a report to the Prime Minister.

After Loos
The future Air Vice Marshal Philip Game, then serving as GSO1 to 46th Division, wrote frequently in letters to his wife (10, 11, 24 November, 8, 10, 20 December 1915) of how Haking interfered frequently with his planning. Game described Haking as "a vindictive bully" and "really impossible, untruthful, a bully and not to be trusted" (letters of December 1915 and April 1916). In May 1916 Haking complained that a unit had "dirt on their clothes" – they had in fact just come out of the trenches.

Haking claimed in May 1916 that no division could be considered a fighting unit until they had carried out a successful trench raid. In John Bourne's view "Haking had already begun to achieve a reputation as something of a loose cannon … he did more than anyone in the BEF to encourage trench raids and "the spirit of the bayonet"". Haking launched what John Bourne describes as "an unnecessary and unsuccessful attack" against a German position called the Boar's Head (19–30 June 1916).

Western Front: Fromelles

Planning
Haking suggested a First Army attack towards Fromelles, not towards Lille as originally planned. Bourne writes: "that (Fromelles) took place at all owed most to the ambition and willingness of Haking to carry it out, and his unshakeable confidence that it would work. Fromelles is difficult to justify as the point for an attack, even a feint attack" as it was flat ground, broken up by water obstacles, and overlooked by Aubers Ridge. Fromelles lay near the boundary of Second and First Armies, opening the possibility of participation by Second Army, whose GOC Plumer was reluctant to mount a diversionary attack at Ypres or Messines. Haking's plan did not take into account the earlier failure on the same ground in May 1915.

Haking "was most optimistic" about the upcoming Somme offensive (Millward War Diary, 22 June 1916). At a conference of his corps commanders (8 July) Monro (GOC First Army) said that the Battle of the Somme was progressing "favourably", but ordered Haking to prepare a plan on the assumption that he was to be assisted by a division of Second Army and some extra artillery (on the same day 4th Australian Division was ordered south to the Somme but instructed to leave behind its artillery). Haking presented a scheme to Monro (9 July) for a two-division attack over a front of 4,200 yards, aiming to capture part of Aubers-Fromelles Ridge, which lay a mile or so behind the German line. Monro initially rejected this plan in favour of a Canadian attack at Vimy Ridge, but after pressure from GHQ – caused by the movement of German reserves from Lille to the Somme sector – informed Haking (13 July) that it was to go ahead. That day Haking's plan was approved at a conference at Choques, attended by Maj-Gen Butler (Deputy Chief of Staff, BEF) with Major Howard in attendance, Maj-Gen Barrow (Chief of Staff First Army) and Maj-Gen Harington (Chief of Staff Second Army). Plumer (GOC Second Army) also approved the plan at another meeting that day, and at another subsequent meeting, and it was agreed that the bombardment – by the equivalent of five or six division's worth of artillery – should start on 14 July, with a view to an attack on 17 July to capture and hold the German first line.

Haking now learned that Second Army were only allocating him the equivalent of two divisions' worth of artillery (that of 4th and 5th Australian Divisions), not three as promised. Haking was also concerned at the shortage of ammunition and the inexperience of the Australian gunners. He therefore reduced the planned width of the attack to around 3,500 yards, apparently in the belief that he had sufficient artillery to cover this effectively.

General Walker refused to let 1st Australian Division take part in Fromelles, for which insubordination he would most likely have been relieved had he been commanding British troops. Instead the 5th Australian Division under J. W. McCay took part – the division was inexperienced and had only been in France a short time. The attack was overlooked by a German fortification called the Sugar Loaf.

At a meeting with Haking, Monro, Plumer, Barrow and Harington on 16 July, Butler reiterated Haig's conditions that sufficient guns and ammunition for counter-battery work be available, and pointed out that intelligence reports of the movement of German reserves meant that the attack was no longer so urgently required. Haking was, however, "most emphatic" that the troops were "worked up … ready and anxious" to attack and that a delay would be poor for morale. Butler again reiterated Haig's concerns in a memo (17 July).

Preparation
Haking told his divisional commanders (at a conference on the afternoon of 16 July) that he wanted to avoid a repetition of what had happened on the Somme on 1 July, when the Germans had had time to man their parapets before the British crossed No Man's Land. The artillery was to stay "on, not over [beyond]" the German positions until the infantry attacked (although he thought that the bombardment over a relatively narrow frontage would "reduce the defenders to a state of collapse before the assault"), and the infantry were to be deployed in No Man's Land ready to "rush forward together" when the signal was given. Haking issued a letter "to be read to all troops", although he "trust(ed) them not to disclose it to anyone". The letter gave details of the artillery bombardment, including plans for a feint – deepening of the range of the bombardment and "show(ing of) bayonets over the parapet" – to tempt the Germans from their front-line dugouts so that they could then be shelled again – and also disclosed that the objective was to be limited to the German first line. The plan was thus well known, even to "the Mademoiselles" behind the British lines, although in practice the Germans, holding the high ground, could see enough of the British lines to guess that an attack was coming.

In the event the attack was postponed because of rain (which made it hard for artillery to register targets). Haking opened his advanced corps HQ at Sailly at 6am on 17 July – a sign that he did not expect the attack to be postponed for long, let alone cancelled. At 8.30am he sent a despatch in which, contradicting the assurances he had given, he admitted that many of the Australian gunners had never fired on the Western Front before, and that many of the infantry were "not fully trained" and "do not appear to be very anxious for the attack to be delivered". Eventually the start times (11am for artillery, 6pm for the infantry attack) were fixed for 19 July.
Although only the German front line was the target, plans were being discussed for further advances, possibly by night, in the event of complete success being achieved.

Initial attack
A "surprise" attack was launched after an 11-hour bombardment, at 6pm on 19 July. Haking launched an attack by two divisions (61st British Division – which consisted of 182nd, 183rd and 184th Brigades under the command of Major-General Colin Mackenzie – and 5th Australian Division) which cost 7,000 casualties. 18th and 14th Australian brigades managed to cross No Mans Land, but then suffered greater casualties in the retreat than in the original attack. 15th and 184th Australian brigades suffered severe casualties crossing No Mans Land for no result.

Controversy over plans to renew the attack
A further attack at 9pm was cancelled by 61st Division, but one Australian battalion attacked alone and suffered severe casualties. This earned the undying disgust of the commander of the Australian 15th Brigade, Brigadier-General Harold 'Pompey' Elliott, who had seen 80% of his two assaulting battalions killed, wounded or captured by night-fall.

The truth appears to be slightly more complicated. Haking, in possession of incomplete information, initially ordered a renewal of the attack the next day. Having received fresh information about the three brigades of 61st Div. at 8.20pm he ordered the 9pm attack to be abandoned and that 183 and 184 brigades return to or remain in their own front line. The 5th Australian Division was ordered to consolidate its gains, ready to assist another attack by 61st Division the following morning, whilst McCay was ordered not to reinforce Elliott's 15th Brigade but rather to withdraw any survivors of the initial assault. These orders were then confirmed again by XI Corps HQ just after 9pm. Pompey Elliott received orders, time stamped 9.25pm, telling him that he might withdraw 59th Battalion if he thought its attack unlikely to succeed. Elliott later claimed in his notes on the battle that McCay had only learned at 8.35pm, from 61st Division, that the latter's attack had been cancelled, too late to stop 58th Battalion going forward, and that the blame therefore lay with Haking. Paul Cobb puts the blame with McCay and his staff for not processing Haking's orders quickly enough.

Whilst 58th Australian Battalion were attacking, Haking changed his mind again on the basis of fresh information: McCay informed him that 8th and 14th Brigades were holding their positions in the German lines, whilst an RFC plane had misinterpreted flares, probably let off by Germans, as indicating the presence of BEF troops. At 10pm Haking's chief of staff, Brigadier-General W. H. Anderson, met with McCay and his chief of staff Lt-Col Wagstaff. Haking now ordered British 184th Brigade to attack the Sugar Loaf at 3am to assist the Australians, whilst McCay was authorised to reinforce his forward positions.

McCay had information about 8th and 14th Brigades, but sent a message (10.30pm) to Elliott's brigade asking for an update. Elliott was himself none the wiser – he knew that 60th Battalion were trying to hold their position in the German lines, but as yet had no information about 58th Battalion attack, and replied (at 11.30pm) that although he was concerned about German machine gun fire he was willing to make another attempt on the Sugar Loaf provided he was reinforced by 57th Battalion. An hour later Elliott learned of the failure of 58th Battalion attack, and notified McCay at once.

Haking then cancelled the night attack at 12.10am after learning that 61st Division had suffered too many casualties already and that trenches were blocked with wounded men.

A 5am conference was held at Sailly, with Monro, Mackenzie, McCay and Barrow. During the meeting an up-to-date report was received from 5th Australian Division HQ, and Monro and Haking ordered that 14th Brigade was to be withdrawn from the German front line rather than reinforced. Haking regarded the battle as over on 2pm on 20 July, when 5th Australian Division returned to the command of II ANZAC Corps. His advance Corps HQ at Sailly closed down an hour later. Monro and Haking concurred with McCay's veto of a proposal (21 July) that an informal local truce be negotiated in the Australian sector to allow the wounded to be collected, although this was in accordance with official GHQ policy at the time.

Reports and recriminations
Four days after the battle, Haking's four-page report accompanied Mackenzie's paper to First Army Headquarters. He wrote that 61st Division was "not sufficiently imbued with the offensive spirit to go in like one man at the appointed time". He conceded that the Australian Division had "attacked in the most gallant manner and gained the enemy’s position" but added that they "were not sufficiently trained to consolidate the ground gained", a phrase which caused angst in the Australian press and was quoted by C. E. W. Bean in the Australian Official History. He claimed that "The artillery preparation was adequate. There were sufficient guns and sufficient ammunition" and that "the wire was properly cut and the assaulting Battalions had a clear run into the enemy’s trenches", omitting to mention that on 17 July he had mentioned that some gunners had never before fired on the Western Front, and that many of the casualties resulted from machine guns fired from positions that the bombardment had failed to suppress. He claimed that "the lessons to be learnt from the attack apply more to the Divisions which took part than to ordinary trained Divisions" ... "the attack, though it failed, ha(d) done both divisions a great deal of good" ... and that "with two trained Divisions the position would have been a gift after the artillery bombardment; with these two new Divisions there was a good chance of success but they did not quite attain it", omitting to mention that he had had a good Division (the 1st) in May 1915. He also wrote that "the attack … has done both Divisions a great deal of good" and also listed the chronology of dates and postponements, claiming that he had been "directed to attack".

An intelligence report of 14 August wrote that no withdrawals of German troops had taken place from the Fromelles sector. Corrigan stresses that the battle "did prevent the Germans from shifting reserves south to the Somme battlefield, and cannot be said to have been without point". By 26 July Haking had received McCay's report and was more generous in his praise of the Australians, although he blamed 61st Division for failing to take the Sugar Loaf.

Wilson (diary 30 July 1916) described Fromelles at the time as "a botch job". Captain Philip Landon testified to Edmonds in 1938 that it had been "as good an illustration as there was of the reckless extravagance in expenditure of life (italics in original) which ruled the minds of some of the subordinate commanders, like Gen Haking, at this stage of the war" ... "the weakness of GHQ lay in not seeing that a Corps Commander, left to himself, would also be tempted to win glory for his Corps by spectacular success, and would be prodigal in using the Divisions which passed through his hands for this purpose". Colonel E. R. Clayton later testified to Edmonds that Haking's "undue optimism was one of the direct causes of failure" of the attack at Fromelles. In the Official History Wilfrid Miles later wrote scathingly of the lack of preparation and the pointlessness of an attack by inexperienced troops, to seize a position which they could not possibly have held against counterattacks, and blames First Army for not cancelling the operation.

Harold Elliott later (in 1930) criticised Haking for exaggerating the amount of artillery that would be available, and for attacking without surprise. He exonerated McCay and argued that Haking, after Major Howard's report (which Haig had annotated to permit the attack only on condition that sufficient guns and ammunition were available) had persuaded Monro, who in turn persuaded Butler, and that Haking had been keen to win glory for himself. He also stressed how Haking had ignored suggestions from Monro that the attack be postponed because of the rain, and was scornful of Haking's after-battle report.

Andy Simpson writes that Fromelles was "a costly failure" but "although the Australian Official Historian blamed Haking for the affair, fault also lay with the First Army and the 5th Australian Division itself".

Passed over for army command

Sheffield describes Haking as acquiring a reputation as a "butcher" and an organiser of pointless "stunts". Haking was one of the few First World War generals to have gained this label while the fighting was still taking place rather than after the war ended. However, it has also been claimed that he acquired the nickname amongst Australian troops from his propensity for ordering trench raids, and that "it is not even known how pejorative the appellation really was" given that amongst Australians " "bastard" is almost a term of affection"

His promotions may have resulted from Haig's patronage, but later attempts by Haig to obtain an Army command for him were unsuccessful. Monro (3 August 1916) recommended Haking as his successor as GOC First Army. When it became known that Haking was the front-runner, Wilson – who had been acting Army Commander earlier in the year and who was also considered for the promotion this time – wrote (5 August) "it only shows how hopelessly out of touch GHQ is with what we all think of Haking". Haig placed Haking in acting command of First Army from 7 August to 29 September 1916.

A letter from the CIGS Robertson (10 August) said that the War Committee vetoed Haking's promotion. The command went instead to Horne. The affair may have caused a curtailing of Haig's powers to make senior appointments.

Haking believed that the Germans on the Somme were "very tired, confused & rather demoralised" and "in a bad way" (Wilson diary 29 August 1916). Haking and his XI Corps took no part in the Somme, which Simpson argues "does not argue for much faith in Haking’s competence … at general headquarters".

Haking was honoured with the Knight Commander of the Order of the Bath (KCB) in 1916.

Later war
Liddell Hart later claimed that Haking had reported Broadwood (57th Division) in early 1917 for "lack of fighting spirit". Haking protested to Horne (GOC First Army) on 18 March 1917 about how he was expected to hold a four-division stretch of front with two divisions, putting too much strain on the units involved. Horne met with him personally to discuss his concerns.

After being sent to reinforce the Italian Front following the disastrous Battle of Caporetto from November 1917 to March 1918, XI Corps was returned to the Western Front and was stationed at Béthune. It was almost immediately engaged by the assault in the German spring offensive of that year. Overall, the Corps protected the Channel ports, although some sections of the Corps were all but destroyed by the German "Georgette" Offensive. In particular the 2nd Portuguese Division suffered 7,000 casualties and 300 officers (out of a divisional strength of 20,000) in the Battle of Estaires. Haking and his Corps "did well" in the halting of this offensive. Haking was not a believer in "defence in depth", but Andy Simpson argues that this was not necessarily a bad thing, as 55th (West Lancashire) Division under his command – fresh troops holding old fortifications – were able to hold their positions and even establish a defensive flank despite the rout of the Portuguese division to their south.

Lloyd George told the War Cabinet (11 April) that the Liberal War Committee (a committee of backbench MPs) had made "very serious protests" to him that afternoon against the retention of "incompetent" officers like Gough (who had just been sacked after his Fifth Army had borne the brunt of the German March Offensive) and Haking. Unlike Gough, Haking retained his command.

General Gomes da Costa later wrote (in O corpo de exercito portugues na Grande Guerra: A batalha do Lys) of "the esteem in which I held General Haking … who always showed himself through his knowledge of the Portuguese language, extremely intelligent and clever, a fine soldier and a loyal friend".

Haking conducted a successful attack at La Bassee in June 1918. Simpson writes that his "performance continued to be far more convincing than earlier in the war". On 17 October 1918 his corps entered the line as part of Birdwood's Fifth Army. Corrigan writes that that autumn Haking "earned a high reputation in the British Offensive which ended the war" whilst Simpson writes that "(h)is promise before the First World War was never realised during it, but he undoubtedly showed far more skill with the soldiers of 1918 than with those under his command in 1915–16".

Haking was honoured with the Knight Commander of the Order of St Michael and St George (KCMG) in 1918.

Post-war

After the war, in Corrigan's view, "his ... career was distinguished": he became chief of the British section of the Armistice Commission in 1918–1919, commander of the British military mission to Russia and the Baltic Provinces in 1919 and commander of Allied troops in the plebiscite area of East Prussia and Danzig in 1920, before becoming High Commissioner to the League of Nations in Danzig in 1921–1923.

Haking was appointed Knight Grand Cross of the Order of the British Empire (GBE) in the 1921 New Year Honours. He became General Officer Commanding the British Troops in Egypt 1923–1927 and was promoted to full general in 1925. He retired in 1927.

Haking died of secondary colon cancer at Old Mill Cottage, Bulford, Wilts, on 9 June 1945. The funeral took place at Bulford on 12 June 1945, with military honours. His wealth at death was £5,579 12s 1d (around £200,000 at 2016 prices) as of 26 November 1945.

Notes

References

Sources

External links

 Biography

|-

|-

1862 births
1945 deaths
People from Halifax, West Yorkshire
Royal Hampshire Regiment officers
British Army generals of World War I
Knights Grand Cross of the Order of the British Empire
Knights Commander of the Order of the Bath
Knights Commander of the Order of St Michael and St George
British military personnel of the Third Anglo-Burmese War
British Army personnel of the Second Boer War
Graduates of the Staff College, Camberley
Academics of the Staff College, Camberley
Graduates of the Royal Military College, Sandhurst
Military personnel from Yorkshire
British Army generals